Supt (Rtd) Datuk Paul Kiong (born 24 October 1944) is a retired Malaysian police officer.

Early life
Paul Kiong was born on 24 October 1944 at Ipoh, Perak. He was the fourth child of 6 siblings.

Police career
Paul received Form six education and earned Higher School Certificate (HSC) in 1962. After that, he joined the Police Force on 16 April 1967 as Police Constable. After completing training, he was posted to Johor Special Branch. Due to his outstanding performance, he gain a rapid promotion on 1 January 1976, he was promoted to Probationary Inspector and was posted to Perak Special Branch.

A year later, on 11 July 1977, he was promoted to Inspector, during this period he went to the jungle to hunt down communist rebels. He also reported capturing forty-three (43) communist rebels without bloodshed. Paul has been promoted to Acting Assistant Superintendent of Police and Assistant Superintendent of Police on 1 June 1983 and 13 May 1986 respectively. In 1990, he was posted to Bukit Aman Special Branch. On 1 January 1992, he was promoted to Deputy Superintendent of Police. On 25 September 1996, he was promoted to Superintendent of Police. Paul was retire by his own choice on 1 February 1998, ending 31 years of service in the police force.

Honours
 :
 Recipient of the Grand Knight of Valour (S.P.) (1983)
 :
Recipient of the Conspicuous Gallantry Medal (P.K.H.) (1988)
 Royal Malaysia Police :
 Warrior of the Most Gallant Police Order (P.P.P.) (1996)
  :
 Knight Commander of the Order of the Territorial Crown (P.M.W.) - Datuk (2011)

References

Malaysian police officers
People from Perak
1944 births
Recipients of the Grand Knight of Valour
Living people